Kalhor is a village in Barvanan-e Gharbi Rural District of Torkamanchay District, Mianeh County, East Azerbaijan province, Iran. At the 2006 National Census, its population was 908 in 179 households. The following census in 2011 counted 769 people in 213 households. The latest census in 2016 showed a population of 779 people in 254 households; it was the largest village in its rural district.

References 

Meyaneh County

Populated places in East Azerbaijan Province

Populated places in Meyaneh County